Mikael Roth (born 8 July 1976) is a Swedish footballer who plays as a defender. He is currently playing for Höörs IS.

Works today at Here We Go in Sweden.

References

External links
 

Association football defenders
Swedish footballers
Allsvenskan players
Superettan players
Malmö FF players
IFK Norrköping players
1976 births
Living people
FC Rosengård 1917 players